Dead Reckoning is the eighth studio album by progressive metal band Threshold. It is their first album since the departure of founding member Nick Midson and the last to feature long time vocalist Andrew "Mac" McDermott.  It is also the only one to feature guest vocals (provided by Dan Swanö on two tracks) and their first album on their current label, Nuclear Blast. The song "Pilot in the Sky of Dreams" appeared on the 2008 film soundtrack In the Name of the King: A Dungeon Siege Tale.

Before settling on the final title, the album had the working title of "Pilot in the Sky of Dreams".

Many of the songs on the album use extensive flight and aviation metaphors. Some of these are conveyed in the titles of the songs (e.g. "Slipstream", "Pilot in the Sky of Dreams", "Safe to Fly"). This theme is reinforced by the album's title, a reference to the early aviation practice of dead reckoning as a way of navigating through estimation of a current position based on a past position, a direction, and a speed.

Track listing

Notes 
The limited edition digipack release, not available in the United States, contains a cover of Muse's "Supermassive Black Hole" as a bonus track.

Members 
 Andrew "Mac" McDermott – vocals
 Karl Groom – guitar
 Richard West – keyboard, piano, backing vocals 
 Steve Anderson – bass guitar
 Johanne James – drums
 Dan Swanö – guest vocals on "Slipstream" and "Elusive"
 Peter Van't Riet – mastering

References 

Threshold (band) albums
2007 albums
Nuclear Blast albums
Albums about aircraft